The Moody Baronetcy, of Garesdon in the County of Wiltshire, was a title in the Baronetage of England. It was created on 11 March 1622 for Henry Moody, later Member of Parliament for Malmesbury. The title became extinct on the death of the second Baronet in circa 1661.

Moody baronets, of Garesdon (1622)
Sir Henry Moody, 1st Baronet (–1629)
Sir Henry Moody, 2nd Baronet ( – )

References

Extinct baronetcies in the Baronetage of England
1622 establishments in England